Uracil/thymine dehydrogenase (uracil oxidase, uracil-thymine oxidase, uracil dehydrogenase) is an enzyme with systematic name uracil:acceptor oxidoreductase. This enzyme catalyses the following chemical reaction

 (1) uracil + H2O + acceptor  barbiturate + reduced acceptor
 (2) thymine + H2O + acceptor  5-methylbarbiturate + reduced acceptor

Uracil/thymine dehydrogenase forms part of the oxidative pyrimidine-degrading pathway in some microorganisms.

References

External links 
 

EC 1.17.99